Muçaj is a village in Fier County, Albania. It was part of the former municipality Dërmenas. At the 2015 local government reform it became part of the municipality Fier.

References

Populated places in Fier